Carl Peter Hagberg (22 November 1778 – 15 September 1841) was a Swedish minister and orator who served in the Swedish Academy.

Hagberg became master of philosophy in 1803. The same year he was ordained as a minister and subsequently served as a preacher at the court, from 1808 with Queen dowager Sophia Magdalena. In 1809 he became the head of the theological seminary at Lund University. The same year he was awarded with a degree of doctor of theology. In 1811 he became professor of pastoral theology. In 1821 he became a member of the Swedish Academy. He also served as president of Pro Fide et Christianismo, a Christian education society.

References

Notes

Sources 
 Brandberg, Gösta (1997). "Rasboprästen Carl Peter Hagberg: en av de aderton”. Rasboglimtar (Rasbo, 1977–) 1997: p. 51-59.
 Hagberg, Theodor (1925). Rasboherden och hans familj: släktkrönika hämtad ur brev och anteckningar. Lund: Gleerup.
 Wibling, Jöran: Carl Peter Hagberg in Svenskt biografiskt lexikon (1967–1969).

1778 births
1841 deaths
Academic staff of Lund University
Members of the Swedish Academy